The flag of Saint Barthélemy is the French tricolor. This is because Saint Barthélemy is a self-governing overseas collectivity of France. An unofficial flag of Saint Barthélemy consisting of the island's coat of arms centered on a white field is also used on the island.

Coat of arms

The coat of arms of Saint-Barthélemy is a shield divided into three horizontal stripes (parted per fess), three gold fleurs-de-lis on blue, above a white Maltese cross on red, over three gold crowns on blue, and "Ouanalao" is what the indigenous people called the island. On top of the shield is a mural crown.

The fleurs-de-lis, Maltese Cross, and gold crowns are heraldic reminders of the island's history as a colony ruled by first the Kingdom of France, then the Knights Hospitaller and in turn the Kingdom of Sweden. Eventually, the island returned to French rule.

On a white background, the arms serves as an unofficial flag for Saint Barthélemy.

References

External links
 

Flags of Overseas France
French coats of arms
National flags
Flag
National coats of arms
Saint Barthelemy
Saint Barthelemy
Saint Barthelemy
Saint Barthelemy
Saint Barthelemy